Kalpalayathanpatti is a village in Tiruchirappalli district, Tamil Nadu, India. This village has around 5000 people, many of whom work in agriculture and construction works.

References

Villages in Tiruchirappalli district

 also one of the grate man born in this village his name is Christhu Samynathan